six4one was a six-piece supergroup formed in November 2005 for the sole purpose of representing Switzerland at the Eurovision Song Contest 2006. The group was made up of six people who were chosen at a casting session that took place November 25–27, 2005. The group were not created as a long-term manufactured band, but instead as "six strong voices" who could collaborate at the contest, and then go their separate ways after the final.

Producer Ralph Siegel, along with the Swiss national broadcaster who decided on such a method to find the Swiss representatives, chose the members of the group from an undisclosed number of auditionees. The six that eventually represented Switzerland included Andreas Lundstedt of Alcazar fame, Tinka Milinović, and Claudia D'Addio the only Swiss-born member of the group and a former participant in the music-based reality show MusicStar.

six4one were guaranteed a place in the Eurovision final thanks to Vanilla Ninja's 8th place the year previous. The song was confirmed as being "If We All Give a Little" in early 2006, and was a slow, ballad-like pop song. However, the song ended initial enthusiasm that had tipped the group as amongst the favourites to win the contest, and after performing first in the final the group slumped to 17th place, receiving only 30 points in total (included one set of 12 points from Keith Camilleri's home country Malta).

The members 

 Andreas Lundstedt - A member of the hugely successful Swedish pop group Alcazar
 Tinka Milinović - Opera singer and TV star from Bosnia-Herzegovina, and former scholar of music with Master's degree in music from Louisiana, USA
 Claudia D'Addio - Known as "The Voice" in Switzerland, D'Addio participated in the MusicStar reality show in the country, and has had three Swiss number one singles as part of it (incidentally, several other MusicStars participants represented Switzerland in the 2004 contest).
 Keith Camilleri - A Maltese singer well known in his home country
 Marco Matias - A former participant in the German pre-qualifying competition for the 2003 and 2005 contests, although he is a native of Portugal
 Liel Kolet - Born in Israel and credited as being the "next Celine Dion", according to one Eurovision's website

External links 

 Article about six4one on official Eurovision website
 Tinka Official Website

Musical groups established in 2005
Eurovision Song Contest entrants for Switzerland
Eurovision Song Contest entrants of 2006